Judith Myers may refer to:
 Judith H. Myers, Canadian-American ecologist
 Judith A. Myers (born 1939), American educator, secretary, and politician
 Judith Myers (Halloween), a character in the Halloween franchise